Victor Parsonnet (born August 29, 1924) is an American cardiac surgeon who contributed significantly to the evolution of cardiac pacemaking.

Parsonnet grew up in Newark, New Jersey and attended Weequahic High School before enrolling at Cornell University. He left Cornell to join the U.S. Navy Reserve during World War II. In 1947 he finished his medical studies at New York University School of Medicine.

In 1955, Parsonnet joined his father's practice at Newark Beth Israel Medical Center, in Newark, New Jersey, which his grandfathers, Max Danzis and Victor Parsonnet, founded in 1901. Parsonnet conducted research and studies with pioneers of the heart surgery field, Michael DeBakey and Denton Cooley (the first person in the United States to perform a heart transplant in 1968).  Parsonnet was the first surgeon in New Jersey to implant a permanent pacemaker (1961) and to complete a heart transplant (1985) and kidney transplant. When asked about his success, he simply says, "I was in the right place at the right time."  Dr. Parsonnet has been on the editorial boards of numerous academic publications, including an editor of The Medical Roundtable, Cardiovascular Edition, a peer-reviewed journal publishing expert roundtable discussions on compelling topics. The former chief of surgery at Newark Beth Israel Medical Center, is now the medical director of the Pacemaker and Defibrillator Evaluation Center and director of Surgical Research at Newark Beth Israel Medical Center. He helped co-found the North American Society of Pacing and Electrophysiology and is the author to over 600 articles and 5 books. He also holds five patents.

Parsonnet also has a deep love for music. Parsonnet grew up in a very musical family. His father was the chair for the New Jersey Symphony Orchestra (NJSO). In 1986, when his father died, Victor was asked to fill his spot. In 1991, Parsonnet became the chairman of the NJSO, a position which he held for 17 years. He is now the chairman emeritus for the NJSO.

In 2019, Parsonnet was inducted into the New Jersey Hall of Fame.

See also
 Famous surgeons

References

"Victor Parsonnet MD, Professor Emeritus." Barnabas Health. Barnabas Health, n.d. Web. 1 Mar. 2014. <http://www.barnabashealth.org>.

Wiener, Robert. "A Surgeon’s Heart Beats to Music and Medicine." New Jersey Jewish News. New Jersey Jewish News, 2011. Web. 1 Mar. 2014. <http://www.njjewishnews.com/njjn.com/040308/njASurgeonsHeart.html>.

External links
 http://www.hrsonline.org/ep-history/notable_figures/bios/victor_parsonnet

American cardiac surgeons
1924 births
Living people
Cornell University alumni
New York University Grossman School of Medicine alumni
Physicians from Newark, New Jersey
Weequahic High School alumni
United States Navy personnel of World War II
United States Navy reservists